The Asia/Oceania Zone was one of the three zones of the regional Davis Cup competition in 1996.

In the Asia/Oceania Zone there were three different tiers, called groups, in which teams competed against each other to advance to the upper tier. Winners in Group I advanced to the World Group Qualifying Round, along with losing teams from the World Group first round. Teams who lost their respective ties competed in the relegation play-offs, with winning teams remaining in Group I, whereas teams who lost their play-offs were relegated to the Asia/Oceania Zone Group II in 1997.

Participating nations

Draw

 relegated to Group II in 1997.
 and  advance to World Group Qualifying Round.

First round

New Zealand vs. China

Indonesia vs. South Korea

Japan vs. Philippines

Australia vs. Chinese Taipei

Second round

South Korea vs. New Zealand

Japan vs. Australia

First round relegation play-offs

Indonesia vs. China

Chinese Taipei vs. Philippines

Second round relegation play-offs

Chinese Taipei vs. Indonesia

References

External links
Davis Cup official website

Davis Cup Asia/Oceania Zone
Asia Oceania Zone Group I